The Coastal Catchment Initiative will seek to deliver significant reductions in the discharge of pollutants to agreed hotspots, where those hotspots have been identified through agreement with the relevant jurisdictions.

The Burdekin regional Coastal Catchments Initiative aims to reduce agricultural pollutants entering rivers and streams within the Burdekin catchment and Great Barrier Reef lagoon.

The NQ Dry Tropics (formerly Burdekin Dry Tropics NRM) Coastal Catchments Initiative (CCI) project intends to achieve pollutant reductions by facilitating the development and implementation of a BDT Water Quality Improvement Plan (WQIP). The CCI project is a collaborative activity amongst various Government agencies, science providers, industry and the community to integrate activities aimed at developing tools and techniques for target setting under Reef Plan and to identify and implement strategies to achieve these targets.

External links 
 National Coastal Catchments Initiative
 Burdekin Water Quality Improvement Plan
 NQ Dry Tropics
 The Australian Centre for Tropical Freshwater Research

Environmental organisations based in Australia